86 may refer to:

 86 (number), a natural number
 86 (term), a slang term for getting rid of something

Dates
 86 BC, a year of the pre-Julian Roman calendar
 AD 86, a common year of the Julian calendar
 1986, a common year of the Gregorian calendar
 2086, a common year of the Gregorian calendar

Art and entertainment
 86 (novel series), a Japanese light novel series and anime series
 "86", a song by Green Day from Insomniac
 Agent 86 or Maxwell Smart, a character on Get Smart
 Eighty-Sixed, a 2017 web series created by Cazzie David and Elisa Kalani
 Eighty-Sixed, a 1989 novel by David B. Feinberg
 86'd, a 2009 novel by Dan Fante
 "86" (Dawn Richard song)

Transportation
 Toyota 86, sports car
 List of highways numbered 86
 86 (MBTA bus)
 86 (New Jersey bus)

See also
 
 A86 (disambiguation)
 x86